General Sir Thomas Musgrave, 7th Baronet (1737 – 1812) was an English soldier. He rose to the rank of general in the British Army and was noted for his service during the American Revolutionary War. He is one of the Musgrave baronets.

Family
Sir Thomas Musgrave, 7th Baronet (1737–1812) was the sixth son and only surviving heir of Sir Richard Musgrave, 4th Baronet of Hayton Castle, Cumberland by his wife, the second daughter of John Hylton of Hylton Castle, Durham.

Military career

Early promotions

He entered the British Army in 1754 as ensign in the 3rd Buffs and quickly rose through the ranks to fulfil a distinguished career. He became a lieutenant on 21 June 1756, and captain in the 64th Regiment of Foot, on 20 August 1759; a brevet-major 23 July 1772; major, 64th Foot, 17 August 1774; and Lieutenant-Colonel, 40th Regiment of Foot, 27 August 1776, on the death of Lieutenant-Colonel James Grant at Brooklyn (Flat Bush).

American War of Independence
He commanded his regiment (40th foot) in the expedition to Philadelphia in the American War of Independence, where he greatly distinguished himself at Germantown, one of Earl Cornwallis's outposts in front of Philadelphia, when the American army in great force attacked the village on the morning of 4 October 1777. Musgrave, with six companies of his regiment, threw himself into a large stone house, later known as Chew House, which he defended with great resolution against repeated attacks, until he was reinforced and the Americans repulsed. The action was commemorated by a silver medal, which was at one time worn as a regimental order of merit. The house is represented on the medal, and is the background of one of the engraved portraits of Musgrave in the British Museum Prints.

Service in the West Indies
Musgrave went in 1778 to the West Indies as quartermaster-general of the troops sent from New York under Major-general James Grant (1720-1806) of Ballindalloch, to capture and defend St. Lucia. He left the West Indies sick, but afterwards returned as brigadier general to America, and was the last British commandant of New York. Along with Brigadier General Samuel Birch, Musgrave signed the certificates of freedom for former black slaves after the war.

Service in England and India
In 1781, he returned home as aide-de-camp to the king, and deputy governor of Stirling Castle. Cornwallis mentions him as at the reviews at Berlin in 1785 with Ralph Abercromby and David Dundas (1735-1820). On 12 Oct. 1787, Musgrave was appointed colonel of the new 76th Regiment of Foot or 'Hindustan' regiment, which was raised for service in India, by the East India Company. The rendezvous was at Chatham, and the recruits were chiefly from the Musgrave family estates in the north of England. Musgrave went out to India with it, and served on the staff at Madras for several years. He became a major-general, 28 April 1790. His hopes of a command against Tipu Sultan were disappointed by Lord Cornwallis, who appears to have thought that Musgrave did not work harmoniously with the civil government of Madras. Musgrave's plan of operations is published in 'Cornwallis's Correspondence. On his return Musgrave received many marks of attention from royalty. He was appointed governor of Chelsea Hospital, but exchanged with William Fawcett for that of Governor of Gravesend and Tilbury, which did not require residence. He became a lieutenant-general 26 June 1797, and general 29 April 1802; and being upon his death colonel of the 76th Regiment of Foot.

Death
He died in London on 31 Dec. 1812, aged 75, and was buried in the churchyard of St George's, Hanover Square, in which parish he had long resided.
A portrait of Musgrave, painted by John White Abbott in 1786, was engraved and appeared in the 'British Military Panorama' in 1813. There is also a memorial to him at St. Kentigern's Church, Aspatria.

The baronetcy expires

Sir James Musgrave, 8th baronet
James was succeeded by his eldest son, Sir James Musgrave, 9th baronet born in London on 24 May 1785. He was educated at Eton College and Christ Church, Oxford, where he was awarded a Bachelor of Arts in 1807. He was Sheriff of Gloucestershire in 1825–6. He died unmarried 6 December 1858.

Sir James Musgrave, 9th baronet
Sir Thomas was succeeded by his cousin Sir James Musgrave, 8th baronet of Barnsley Park, near Cirencester, Gloucestershire. He was the son of Reverend James Musgrave D.C.L. (Doctor of Civil [or Canon] Law), Rector (ecclesiastical) of Chinnor, Oxfordshire. James was born in 1752, he matriculated at St John's College, Oxford, where he received a Bachelor of Arts. in 1773 and a Master of Arts in 1777. He was Sheriff of Gloucestershire, 1802–03. He married Clarissa, daughter of Thomas Blackhall, of Great Haseley, Oxfordshire. He died on 27 April 1814.

Sir William Augustus Musgrave, 10th baronet
James was succeeded by his brother Sir William Musgrave, 10th baronet. He was born in 1792 at St Marylebone, educated at Westminster School, matriculated at Christ Church, Oxford where he received a Bachelor of Arts in 1813 and a Master of Arts two years later. He took Holy orders and became Rector (ecclesiastical) at Chinnor and eventually Emmington, Oxfordshire. He died unmarried on 30 September 1875, when the baronetcy became extinct.

References

Bibliography

 

  

|-

1737 births
1812 deaths
People from Allerdale
People from Aspatria
British Army generals
Baronets in the Baronetage of Nova Scotia
British Army personnel of the American Revolutionary War
People educated at Eton College
Alumni of Christ Church, Oxford